Andre Begemann and Frederik Nielsen were the defending champions but chose not to defend their title.

Sander Arends and Tristan-Samuel Weissborn won the title after defeating Luke Bambridge and Joe Salisbury 4–6, 6–1, [10–7] in the final.

Seeds

Draw

References
 Main Draw

Open Harmonie mutuelle - Doubles
2018 Doubles